David Joseph  is the chairman and CEO of Universal Music UK.

Biography
David Joseph is Chairman and CEO of Universal Music UK. He joined the company in August 1998 as general manager of the company's Polydor label before moving up in February 2002 to become managing director and later co-president of Polydor. In March 2008, he was promoted to chairman and CEO of Universal Music UK since when he oversees the labels 0207 Def Jam, Island, Polydor, Capitol, Decca and EMI, as well as the world's most famous recording studios Abbey Road. Universal Music UK is home to successful artists from across the musical spectrum including The Rolling Stones, Elton John, U2,  Florence + The Machine, Mumford & Sons, Take That, The 1975, Sam Smith, Stormzy, Sam Fender, Dave, Lewis Capaldi, Michael Kiwanuka, Years & Years, Bastille, Ellie Goulding, Nicola Benedetti, and Celeste. It also releases the music of global superstars such as Drake, Ariana Grande, Justin Bieber, Billie Eilish, Taylor Swift, Eminem, Kendrick Lamar, Lady Gaga, Selena Gomez, and Rihanna. Its catalogue includes the music of Abba, The Beatles and Queen. Prior to joining Universal Music, Joseph was at RCA where he was head of artist development, working with artists including Take That, Kylie Minogue and Annie Lennox.
 
In 2005, Joseph became a member of the BPI Council and for three years from 2010 was chairman of the Brits Committee, which oversees the Brit Awards. As reported in The Guardian in 2011, Joseph oversaw an overhaul of the Brit Awards, moving it to the O2 and giving prime-time television exposure to acts such as Arcade Fire and Mumford & Sons, as well as Adele's acoustic performance of "Someone Like You". 2012's show attracted its biggest television audience since 2005. In 2013 Joseph worked with Doreen Lawrence, Baroness Lawrence of Clarendon to gather music industry support for Unity, the O2 concert marking the 20th anniversary of Stephen Lawrence's murder. In September 2013 he was appointed as a member of the council of Arts Council England.

In 2015, Joseph became the executive producer of Amy, the documentary film about the late singer Amy Winehouse, directed by Asif Kapadia. Amy became the highest-grossing British documentary of all time, taking £3 million at the box office in its first weekend and has won many awards, among them Best Documentary at the 69th British Academy Film Awards, Best Music Film at the 58th Grammy Awards and the Academy Award for Best Documentary Feature at the 88th Academy Awards.[9]

Joseph was appointed Commander of the Order of the British Empire (CBE) in the 2016 New Year Honours for services to the music industry.

In 2017, Joseph became a trustee and vice chair of the Grenfell Foundation, an organisation which supports survivors, bereaved families and the community to remember the event of 14 June 2017 and to keep the memory of their loved ones in hearts and minds.

Joseph gave the lead interview in the first edition of Music Business UK, the new quarterly title from Music Business Worldwide.

In 2019, Joseph gave an interview in the Evening Standard on the importance of embracing neurodiversity in the workplace. The following year he launched Universal Music’s Creative Differences project, led by the publication of the first handbook for embracing neurodiversity in the creative industries, which was widely covered across BBC networks.

In 2020, Joseph oversaw another successful overhaul of the BRIT Awards, which included standout performances from the likes of Dave, Stormzy and Celeste. As reported in Billboard, the show was met with “widespread praise from the UK music industry, with many observers hailing at it as the best BRITs in years”.

In 2021, Joseph became an ambassador for the Autism Centre of Excellence (ACE) at Cambridge University. 

In 2022, Joseph spoke at the launch of the Power Of Music report hosted at Universal Music UK’s offices. The report outlines a blueprint to use music to help transform communities and improve the nation’s health and wellbeing. It includes a commitment from Universal Music UK to develop a dynamic online resource which will serve as a music and dementia information hub.

References

Living people
Year of birth missing (living people)
Place of birth missing (living people)
People educated at JFS (school)
British chief executives
British Jews
British music industry executives
Commanders of the Order of the British Empire